The Vlăsia is a left tributary of the river Cociovaliștea in Romania. It discharges into the Cociovaliștea in Lake Căldărușani near Grădiștea.

References

Rivers of Romania
Rivers of Dâmbovița County
Rivers of Ilfov County